The three-bearded rockling (Gaidropsarus vulgaris) is found in European waters from the central Norwegian coast and the Faroe Islands, through the North Sea, and around the British Isles to the region around the western Mediterranean. They can grow to a maximum length of 60 cm (2 ft). Their coloration varies from dusky to pale, with large chocolate-brown spots on the head and body, and fin coloration varies with location. They also may have xanthochromism,  which is colour condition characterized by overt of yellow-orange-red pigmentation, because of high levels of xanthophores in the skin.  Three barbels, one on the bottom jaw and two on the snout, provide the fish with its common name.

References

 
 Quigley, D. T., Lord, R., Macgabhann, D., & Flannery, K. (2017). First records of xanthochromism in three-bearded rockling Gaidropsarus vulgaris (Cloquet, 1824) and pollack Pollachius pollachius (Linnaeus, 1758). Journal of Applied Ichthyology, 33(6), 1208–1210. doi:10.1111/jai.13456

External links
 

three-bearded rockling
Fauna of the British Isles
three-bearded rockling
Fish of Europe
Fish of the Mediterranean Sea
Fish of the North Sea
three-bearded rockling